

Men's events

Women's events

Medal table

Events at the 1987 Pan American Games
Fencing at the Pan American Games
International fencing competitions hosted by the United States
1987 in fencing